Ahmadabad-e Sar Tang (also Romanized as Aḩmadābād-e Sar Tang; also known as Sar Tang-e Dūlāb) is a village in Abezhdan Rural District, Abezhdan District, Andika County, Khuzestan Province, Iran. At the 2006 census, its population was 112, in 23 families.

References 

Populated places in Andika County